Pind Rahim Shah is a small village near Miani town in Sargodha District, Punjab province, Pakistan. The village was founded by Rahim Shah - hence the name Pind Rahim Shah or village of Rahim Shah. There are many ethnic groups in the village but the majority are Sherazi Syed, who originate from Shiraz a city of Iran.

References

Populated places in Sargodha District